Quailwood is a former unincorporated community now incorporated into Bakersfield in Kern County, California. It lies at an elevation of 384 feet (117 m).

References

Neighborhoods in Bakersfield, California